Woodcrest State College is a coeducational public Prep–Year 12 school located in the City of Ipswich suburb of Springfield in Queensland, Australia. The school has a total enrolment of more than 1600 students each year, with an official count of 1745 students in 2021.

Between 1998 to 2022, Pat Murphy was the Executive Principal of Woodcrest State College. Since 2022, Woodcrest State College's role of Executive Principal has been held by Jeff Jones. The school also consists of two Heads of School, one Business Services Manager, two Guidance Officers and 91 teaching staff.

Sporting houses

Woodcrest State College includes the following four sporting houses with their respective colours:

Facilities

Facilities at Woodcrest State College include:

 Primary Resource Centre (Prep–Year 6 library facility)
 Secondary Resource Centre (Year 7–Year 12 library facility)
 The Hangar; a technology hub located in the Secondary School precinct
 The Nest; a catering facility
 Primary sports hall
 Secondary sports hall & gymnasium
 Dance & Drama studio
 Auditorium
 Manual Arts facilities
 Science laboratories
 Two sports ovals
 Multipurpose sports courts
 Tennis courts
Homework Centre (Year 7 to 12 learning facility)
iThrive (Year 7 to 12 student wellbeing hub)

Curriculum

Prep–Year 6

The Prep–Year 6 curriculum is developed from the Australian Curriculum, Assessment and Reporting Authority and includes English, Mathematics, Science, History and Geography. Additionally, specialist lessons are also provided, with Music lessons provided to Prep–Year 3 students, Health & Physical Education lessons provided to Prep–Year 6 students and Japanese lessons provided to Years 4–6 students.

Signature programs

Catalyst Program

The Catalyst Program is a four-year program that enables students to engage in academically rigorous, inquiry-based learning in order to attain academic excellence. These students have opportunities to engage in innovative learning experiences in which they solve real-world problems with the aid of emerging technologies.

Academy Sports Programs

Woodcrest State College includes the Academy Sports Programs of the Basketball Academy, the Volleyball Academy and the AFL School of Excellence. Students selected in one of these programs are offered high-level coaching with access to elite competitions.

WesTEC Trade Training Centre

The WesTEC Trade Training Centre is a national Trade Training Centre operated by Woodcrest State College in partnership with Forest Lake State High School, Redbank Plains State High School and Springfield Central State High School. WesTEC's training partner, TAFE South West, provides industry standard training to Years 11 and 12 students in a range of training areas including automotive, construction, engineering, hairdressing, health support services and logistics.

English

English is a compulsory core subject across the Year 7–10 curriculum. Students in Year 10 study either General English or Essential English. English subjects available to students in Years 11 and 12 include the General subject of English and the Applied subject of Essential English.

Mathematics

Mathematics is a compulsory core subject across the Year 7–10 curriculum. In Year 10, there is the option of Essential Mathematics Prep, General Mathematics Prep, and Mathematics Extension Prep. Mathematics subjects available to students in Years 11 and 12 include the General subjects of General Mathematics, Mathematical Methods and Specialist Mathematics, and the Applied subject of Essential Mathematics.

Humanities

The Humanities faculty consists of the compulsory core subjects of History, Geography, Business & Economics and Civics & Citizenship across the Year 7-10 curriculum, with Business & Economics and Civics & Citizenship studied in Years 9 and 10 only. In Year 10, the elective subject of Philosophy is available. Humanities subjects available to students in Years 11 and 12 include the General subjects of Accounting, Ancient History, Business, Geography, Legal Studies and Modern History.

Science

Science is a compulsory core subject across the Year 7–9 curriculum. Elective science subjects available to students in Year 10 include the semester-long subjects of Biology & Chemistry, Psychology, Science in Practice and Physics, Earth & Environmental. Science subjects available to students in Years 11 and 12 include the General subjects of Biology, Chemistry, Earth & Environmental Science and Physics, and the Applied subject of Science in Practice.

Japanese

Japanese is the Language Other Than English studied at Woodcrest State College, which is studied for one semester in Years 7 and 8. From Year 9, Japanese becomes an elective subject.

Health & Physical Education

Health & Physical Education is a compulsory core subject across the Year 7–9 curriculum, which is studied for one semester. Elective Health & Physical Education subjects available to students in Year 10 include Physical Education and Sport & Recreation. Health & Physical Education subjects available to students in Years 11 and 12 include the General subject of Physical Education and the Applied subject of Early Childhood Studies.

The Arts

Year 7 students rotate through the Arts subjects of Media Studies, Drama, Music and Visual Arts whereas Year 8 students undertake these same subjects as well as Dance. The subjects of Dance, Music and Visual Art are studied as elective subjects in Year 9 and in Year 10, the four subjects of Dance, Media Studies, Music and Visual Art are available. Arts subjects available to students in Years 11 and 12 include the General subjects of Dance, Drama, Music, Visual Art and Film, Television & New Media.

Technology

The subjects of Home Economics and Manual Arts are studied for one semester by all students in Years 7 and 8. In Year 9, these subjects become electives and the subject of Digital Technologies becomes available. Technology subjects available to students in Years 11 and 12 include the General subject of Design and the Applied subjects of Engineering Skills, Furnishing Skills, Hospitality Practices, Industrial Graphics Skills and Information & Communication Technology.

STEM

Woodcrest State College's Science, Technology, Engineering and Mathematics (STEM) program is an elective subject available to Year 10 academic students. In this program, students have opportunities to develop skills such as communication, collaboration, creative and critical thinking, ICT skills and personal social skills.

Vocational Education & Training

Vocational Education & Training (VET) courses available to students in Years 11 and 12 include:

 Certificate II in Hospitality (SIT20207)
 Certificate II in Music Industry (CUA20615)
 Certificate II in Skills for Work and Vocational Pathways (FSK20113)
 Certificate II in Sport & Recreation (SIS20115)

 Certificate II in Visual Arts (CUA20715)
 Certificate III in Business (BSB30115)
 Certificate III in Fitness (SIS30315)

Notable alumni

 Ashleigh Barty, professional tennis player and former cricketer

References

External links
 

Public schools in Queensland
Schools in South East Queensland
Schools in Ipswich, Queensland
Educational institutions established in 1998
1998 establishments in Australia